Marie Marguerite Sarah Duhamel (March 21, 1873 – April 15, 1926) was a French stage and film comedienne.

Career 
Duhamel was the daughter of an operetta singer and appeared on stage at a very young age. In 1893 she made her debut as a singer with the play Eldorado, and consequently went on a two-year tour through Italy and the South of France. From 1895 on she worked at various revues in Paris. In 1910 she met the film director Romeo Bosetti who worked for Pathé Comica in Nice. She made several short comedy films with Bosetti, her character was called ‘Rosalie’ (in the English-speaking countries ‘Jane’). Later she started working for the company Eclair (La Société française des films et cinématographiques Eclair) where her character was called Pétronille. She was also cast to star with Maurice Schwartz in the Little Moritz series, and with Lucien Bataille in his Casimir comedies.

Duhamel’s partnership with Bosetti lasted until 1916, when he stopped filmmaking due to his injuries suffered during the WWI. After the World War I, Duhamel's career became less successful, though she continued to work on stage and for films.

Private life 
In 1915 Duhamel married Édouard Louis Schmitt (1884-1972), a fellow stage actor better known as Darmaine or Darmène. Duhamel’s older sister Louise Jeanne Bibiane Duhamel (1870-1910) was also famous as an operetta singer.

Filmography

As Rosalie 

 1911 : Little Moritz enlève Rosalie (Henri Gambart, scénario Romeo Bosetti)
 1911 : Rosalie et Léontine vont au théâtre (Romeo Bosetti)
 1911 ; Rosalie a trouvé du travail (Romeo Bosetti)
 1911 : Le jour de l'an de Rosalie [Romeo Bosetti ?]
 1911 : La Mitrailleuse [Romeo Bosetti ?]
 1911 : Domestiques bon teint [Romeo Bosetti ?]
1911 : Rosalie et son phonographe [Romeo Bosetti]
 1912 : Je ne veux plus de cuisinière [Romeo Bosetti ?]
 1912 : Les Araignées de Rosalie [Romeo Bosetti ?]
 1912 : C'est la faute à Rosalie [Romeo Bosetti ?]

As Pétronille 

 1911 : Little Moritz et le papillon
 1912 : Pétronille gagne le grand steeple
 1913 : Pétronille à la caserne
 1913 : Pétronille cherche une situation
 1913 : Le Singe de Pétronille
 1913 : Gavroche au pensionnat de Pétronille
 1913 : Gavroche et Pétronille visitent Berlin
 1913 : Gavroche et Pétronille visitent Londres
 1913 : Pour gagner le million
 1913 : Casimir et Pétronille font bon ménage
 1913 : Casimir et Pétronille font de l'auto
 1913 : Casimir et Pétronille font un héritage
 1914 : Casimir et Pétronille n'ont pas vu les souverains
 1914 : Casimir fait de l'entrainement
 1914 : Casimir, Pétronille et l'Entente cordiale
 1914 : Casimir tangue
 1914 : La Vengeance de Casimir
 1914 : Le Désespoir de Pétronille
 1914 : Pétronille porteuse de pain
 1914 : Pétronille suffragette
 1914 : La Ruse de Pétronille
 1916 : Casimir et Pétronille au bal de l'ambassade

Other films 

 1912 : Un drame passionnel
 1916 : C'est pour les orphelins ! (Louis Feuillade)
 1922 : Les Mystères de Paris (Charles Burguet)

Stage work 

 1889 : Monsieur Alphonse, (Alexandre Dumas fils) : Adrienne
 1892 : Article de Paris (Maxime Boucheron, Edmond Audran)
 1892 : La Petite Pologne, (Lambert Thiboust and Ernest Blum): Fauvette
 1892 : Les Mouchards, (Jules Moinaux and Paul Parfait) : Andrée
 1892 : La Lune à Paris, (Jules Oudot, Léon Nunès, and Léon Schlésinger) : Miss Helyett
 1895 : Les Contes de Piron, (Gaston Habrekorn and Célestin Controne) : Suzanne
 1895 : Paris-Sensuel, (Léon Némo and A. Bural) : la commère
 1896 : Les Bibelots du diable, (Théodore Cogniard and Clairville) : Risette
 1896 : Les Deux rosses, (Pierre Decourcelle by Paul Briollet and Jacques Yvel, and Émile Duhem and Émile Cambillard)
 1896 : La Petite goualeuse, (Gaston Marot and A. Lévy) : la petite goualeuse
 1902 : La Demoiselle de chez Maxim's, (Gardel-Hervé) : la môme Grenouille
 1903 : Josiane !, (Valérien Tranel and Eugène Joullot) : Josiane
 1908 : Cartes transparentes, (Jules Moy)
 1908 : Une nuit tragique au pays du Czar, (Montéhus) : l'héroïne
 1910 : Pige-moi ça !, (Cinq-Mars and Charles Pillon) : la femme au cadenas
 1910 : La Conscrite, (Raoul Hugo) : la colonelle
 1922 : Madame Cantharide, (Louis Lemarchand and Fernand Rouvray)

Further reading 
 Chirat, Raymond.; Le Roy, Eric., Catalogue des films français de fiction de 1908 à 1918. Cinémathèque française, Musée du cinéma, [Paris] ([1995]). 
 Preschl, Claudia., Lachende Körper : Komikerinnen im Kino der 1910er Jahre. Synema - Ges. für Film u. Medien, Wien (2008).

Sources

External links 
 Sarah Duhamel on the Internet Movie Database

20th-century French actresses
French comedians
Slapstick comedians
French stage actresses
1873 births
1926 deaths
19th-century French actresses
French film actresses
French women comedians
20th-century French comedians